Humahuaca is a small city in the province of Jujuy, Argentina. Since 2003 declared World Heritage Site by UNESCO at the Paris conference.
The city is widely known for its location at the Quebrada de Humahuaca, along the Eastern valley of the central Andean Altiplano.

Humahuaca is located north of Tilcara and Purmamarca, in the colourful valley of Quebrada de Humahuaca. 
In the center of the village, there is a church tower which can be seen from the main square with a clock that chimes at 12 pm, after which a small door opens and a figure of Saint Francisco Solano comes out and makes the sign of the cross.

Climate
Humahuaca has a cool arid climate (Köppen BWk), with two seasons: a mild summer with occasional thunderstorms from December to March, and a cool, extremely clear, rainless winter covering the rest of the year. Although afternoons are warm year-round, the extreme altitude means mornings are cool in summer and freezing in the rainless, cloudless winter.

Personalities
 Uña Ramos (1933-2014), compositor and Quena (Kena) player, born in Humahuaca.

References

External links
 San Francisco Solano de la Bendición (photos)
 Coord. geográficas + imágenes NASA, Google

Filmed in Humahuaca
 Verónico Cruz,'' (1988).

Populated places in Jujuy Province
Jujuy Province
Argentina